Erzyan Mastor ('Erzya land') is an Erzyan- and Russian-language bilingual newspaper published by the Foundation for the Salvation of the Erzya Language in Saransk, capital of Mordovia in the Russian Federation.

History 
It was established in the capital of Republica of Mordovia in Saransk on September 20, 1994. Its first editor was Aleksandr Sharonov. He was replaced by Maryz Kemal, poetess and executive secretary of the Chilisema Children's Journal in Erzya, who served as chief editor from 1994 – 2017.

A case against the newspaper had gone on for two years, beginning on July 23, 2007. The newspaper was accused by Prosecutor General of Mordovia of publishing "extremist materials". On June 30, 2009, the state court of the Republic of Mordovia ruled that the publication of Erzyan Mastor may continue.

References

External links 
Web page of Erzyan Mastor

Russian-language newspapers published in Russia
Bilingual newspapers
Saransk